HMS K8 was a British K class submarine built by Vickers, Barrow-in-Furness. She was laid down on 28 June 1915 and was commissioned on 6 March 1917. K8 was sold on 11 October 1923.

Design

K8 displaced  when at the surface and  while submerged. The submarine was powered by two oil-fired Yarrow Shipbuilders boilers each supplying one geared Brown-Curtis or Parsons steam turbine; this developed 10,500 ship horsepower (7,800 kW) to drive two  screws. Submerged power came from four electric motors each producing . It was also had an  diesel engine to be used when steam was being raised, or instead of raising steam.

K8 was armed with ten  torpedo tubes, two  deck guns, and a  anti-aircraft gun. Its torpedo tubes were four in the bows, four in the midship section firing to the sides, and two were mounted on the deck in a rotating mounting. Its complement was fifty-nine crew members.

References

Bibliography
 Robert Hutchinson, Submarines, war beneath the waves, from 1776 to the present day

 

Ships built in Barrow-in-Furness
British K-class submarines
Royal Navy ship names
1916 ships